A lyric soprano is a type of operatic soprano voice that has a warm quality with a bright, full timbre that can be heard over an orchestra. The lyric soprano voice generally has a higher tessitura than a soubrette and usually plays ingenues and other sympathetic characters in opera. Lyric sopranos have a range from approximately middle C (C4) to "high D" (D6). This is the most common female singing voice. There is a tendency to divide lyric sopranos into two groups: light and full.

Light lyric soprano 
A light-lyric soprano has a bigger voice than a soubrette but still possesses a youthful quality. There are a wide variety of roles written for this voice, and they may sing soubrette, baroque and other light roles as well.

Light lyric soprano roles
Source:

 Alice, Le comte Ory (Gioachino Rossini)
 Ännchen, Der Freischütz (Carl Maria von Weber) (or soubrette)
 Annina, La traviata (Giuseppe Verdi)
 Antonia, The Tales of Hoffmann (Jacques Offenbach)
 Clorinda, La Cenerentola (Gioachino Rossini)
 Despina, Così fan tutte (Wolfgang Amadeus Mozart) (or soubrette)
 Euridice, Orfeo ed Euridice (Christoph Willibald Gluck)
 Gretel, Hänsel und Gretel (Engelbert Humperdinck)
 Juliette, Roméo et Juliette (Charles Gounod)
 Laurie Moss, The Tender Land (Aaron Copland)
 Lauretta, Gianni Schicchi (Giacomo Puccini)
 Marguerite, Faust (Charles Gounod)
 Marzelline, Fidelio (Ludwig van Beethoven)
 Manon, Manon (Jules Massenet)
 Musetta, La bohème (Puccini)
 Pamina, The Magic Flute (Mozart)
 Servilia, La clemenza di Tito (Mozart)
 Sophie, Der Rosenkavalier (Richard Strauss)
 Sophie, Werther (Jules Massenet)
 Susanna, The Marriage of Figaro (Mozart) (or soubrette)
 Zerlina, Don Giovanni (Mozart) (or soubrette)

Full lyric soprano
A full-lyric soprano has a more mature sound than a light-lyric soprano and can be heard over a bigger orchestra. This more mature sound may make a full-lyric less suitable for some of the lighter roles. Occasionally a full lyric will have a big enough voice that she can take on much heavier roles, using volume in place of vocal weight. This is done when a more lyric timbre is desired in an otherwise heavier role. Otherwise full lyric sopranos need be judicious with spinto and other heavy roles to prevent vocal deterioration.

Full lyric soprano roles
Source:

 Emilia, The Makropulos Case (Leoš Janáček)
 La Contessa, The Marriage of Figaro (Wolfgang Amadeus Mozart)
 Liù, Turandot (Giacomo Puccini)
 Lulu, Lulu (Alban Berg)
 The Marschallin, Der Rosenkavalier (Richard Strauss)
 Magda, La rondine (Puccini)
 Wally, La Wally (Alfredo Catalani)
 Mimì, La bohème (Puccini)
 Micaëla, Carmen (Georges Bizet)
 Rusalka, Rusalka (Antonín Dvořák)
 Tatyana, Eugene Onegin (Pyotr Ilyich Tchaikovsky)
 Hanna, The Merry Widow (Franz Lehár)
 Bess, Porgy and Bess (George Gershwin)

See also

Coloratura soprano
Spinto soprano
Dramatic soprano
Soubrette

References
Notes

Sources

Further reading 
 

Opera terminology
 
Voice types

fr:Soprano#Soprano lyrique